Bernard Labourdette (13 August 1946 – 20 July 2022) was a French professional road bicycle racer, who won stage 16A in the 1971 Tour de France.

Major results 

 1970
 1st Stage 2b Vuelta a La Rioja
 3rd Overall Volta a Catalunya
 1971
 1st Stage 3 Critérium du Dauphiné Libéré
 2nd Overall Volta a Catalunya
 2nd 
 4th Overall Tour of the Basque Country
 1st Stage 3
 8th Overall Tour de France
 1st Stage 16A
 1972
 1st Overall Étoile des Espoirs
 1973
 2nd Grand Prix d'Aix-en-Provence
 10th Overall Vuelta a España
 1974
 10th Overall Setmana Catalana de Ciclisme
 1975
 2nd Overall Tour Méditerranéen
 10th GP Monaco
 1976
 2nd Overall Étoile de Bessèges
 5th Overall Tour de l'Aude
 8th Overall Grand Prix du Midi Libre

Grand Tour general classification results timeline

External links 
 
 Official Tour de France results for Bernard Labourdette

1946 births
2022 deaths
Sportspeople from Pyrénées-Atlantiques
French male cyclists
French Tour de France stage winners
Cyclists from Nouvelle-Aquitaine